Max Mayer is an American filmmaker. He is one of the founding members of New York Stage and Film. Well known for directing TV shows including The West Wing and Alias, he wrote and directed the film Adam (2009), winner of the Alfred P. Sloan Prize.

Filmography
 Me and Veronica (1993, producer) 
 Better Living (1998)
 Adam (2009)
 As Cool as I Am (2013)

References

External links
 

American film directors
Living people
American screenwriters
American television directors
Year of birth missing (living people)
Alfred P. Sloan Prize winners